Padre nuestro ("Our Father"), also known as Sangre de mi sangre ("Blood of My Blood") is a 2007 Argentinean-American thriller film written and directed by Christopher Zalla, produced by Benjamin Odell and Per Melita and starring Jesús Ochoa, Armando Hernández, Jorge Adrián Espíndola, and Paola Mendoza. The film won the Grand Jury Prize at the 2007 Sundance Film Festival.

Premise
Padre nuestro tells the story of Pedro, a young Mexican boy who smuggles himself to Brooklyn to meet his long-lost father, but whose identity is stolen by an impostor.

Cast
 Jesús Ochoa as Diego
 Armando Hernández as Juan
 Jorge Adrián Espíndola as Pedro
 Paola Mendoza as Magda
 Eugenio Derbez as Anibal
 Scott Glascock as John
 Lev Gorn as Rough-Shave

Release
Padre nuestro premiered on January 22, 2007 at the Sundance Film Festival and has been screened at New Directors/New Films Festival. The film was released in Spain on October 5, 2007 and in Mexico on February 29, 2008. It opened in limited release in the United States on May 14, 2008.

Critical reception
On review aggregator Rotten Tomatoes, Padre nuestro reported that 79% of critics gave the film positive reviews, based on 39 reviews. The site’s critics consensus reads, "This suspenseful Mexican drama portrays the immigrant experience with grit and poignancy." Metacritic reported the film had an average score of 55 out of 100, based on 12 reviews.

Awards and honors
 Grand Jury Prize: Dramatic at the 2007 Sundance Film Festival.
 Nominated, Independent Spirit Awards, 2008: Best First Feature (for Zalla, Odell and Melita) and Best Screenplay (for Zalla)

References

External links
 
 
 
 
 
 Padre nuestro at Sundance

2007 films
2007 independent films
2007 psychological thriller films
American independent films
American psychological thriller films
Argentine independent films
2000s Spanish-language films
Films about illegal immigration to the United States
Films set in New York City
Films shot in New York City
Films shot in Tijuana
2000s road movies
Sundance Film Festival award winners
2000s English-language films
2000s American films